Albert Anson Dorrance IV (born April 9, 1951) is an American soccer coach. He is currently the head coach of the women's soccer program at the University of North Carolina.  He has one of the most successful coaching records in the history of athletics. Under Dorrance's leadership, the Tar Heels have won 21 of the 31 NCAA Women's Soccer Championships. The Tar Heels' record under Dorrance stood at 809-67-36 (.887 winning percentage) over 33 seasons at the end of the 2017 season. He has led his team to a 101-game unbeaten streak and coached 13 different women to a total of 20 National Player of the Year awards.

The NCAA has recognized Dorrance as the Women's Soccer Coach of the Year seven times (1982, 1986, 1997, 2000, 2001, 2003 and 2006) and as the Men's Soccer Coach of the Year in 1987. On March 10, 2008, Dorrance was elected to the National Soccer Hall of Fame.

Early life
Dorrance was born in Bombay, India on April 9, 1951, the son of an American oil executive. He spent his youth moving with his family throughout Europe and Africa.  Of all the places he lived, three had particular influences on his later life. In Addis Ababa, Ethiopia he met his future wife, M'Liss Gary, the daughter of the U.S. Air Force attache to Ethiopia. He attributes his love of soccer to his years living in Kenya. He gained his education from the Villa St. Jean International School boarding school, located in Fribourg, Switzerland, where he played soccer for three years and graduated in 1969.

After graduating from Villa St. Jean, he moved to the United States and attended St. Mary's University in San Antonio, Texas, where he played soccer for a semester. He transferred after the fall term to the University of North Carolina. There, he was a member of St. Anthony Hall. His love of soccer led him to walk onto the school's soccer team, then coached by Marvin Allen, where he was a three time All-ACC player. As he transferred from another college, he was ineligible to play during his sophomore year, and only joined the team as a junior in 1971. He played as a midfielder, and was team captain in 1973 as a post-senior. In 1974, he graduated with a B.A. in English and Philosophy. That year he also married his childhood sweetheart, M'Liss Gary, with whom he has three children: Michelle, Natalie, and Donovan. After graduating, Dorrance was the player-coach of Chapel Hill Soccer Club.

Under the influence of his father, Dorrance entered North Carolina Central University Law School in 1976, later transferring to the University of North Carolina School of Law. That same year, Coach Allen convinced Dorrance to succeed him as the UNC men's soccer coach. From 1977 until 1988 Dorrance compiled a 175–65–21 (.708) record with the team. His greatest success with the men's team came in 1987 when he led them to the Atlantic Coast Conference tournament championship. They beat North Carolina State University 3-2 winning their first ACC tournament. They also went to the NCAA Final Four in 1987 losing to Clemson University 4–1 in the semi final game. That same year he also won the NCAA Men's Soccer Coach of the Year.

UNC women's soccer team

In 1979 UNC expanded Dorrance's duties to include the newly established women's team as well as the men's soccer team. It was this event which moved Dorrance into the limelight. At this time, the NCAA did not have a women's soccer championship. When the NCAA showed no interest in establishing one, Dorrance and University of Colorado coach, Chris Lidstone, approached the AIAW, who were receptive to the idea. Within two years of the start of the program, Dorrance had guided the Tar Heels to the 1981 Association for Intercollegiate Athletics for Women (AIAW) title. After the AIAW led the way, the NCAA finally recognized women's soccer as an inter-collegiate sport and Dorrance's teams proceeded to dominate the sport. His teams won 12 of the first 13 NCAA championships (1982–1984, 1986–1994).  After winning the 2012 NCAA championship, the Tar Heels have claimed a total of 23 national championships and 22 of the 37 NCAA championships.

Dorrance's success comes from several interrelated attributes. First, he has an eye for recruiting outstanding talent. Related to that is his emphasis on competitiveness. He noted early in his time as a women's coach that women seemed to have an inhibition against open competition. He decided to develop an atmosphere at UNC in which women were rewarded for having an aggressive desire to win. Finally, he noted from his work with both the men's and women's teams that women tended to play best in an atmosphere which focused on relationships.

Dorrance was able to bring out his players' aggressiveness and competitiveness while also fostering an almost family sense of the team. Regarding the aggressiveness, Santa Clara University women's soccer coach Jerry Smith noted in a 1998 Sports Illustrated article, "When you watch them, you can see the edge they have. I'll go beyond aggressiveness. It's meanness. Anson has found a way to bring that out of his players." Mia Hamm added in the same article, "I grew up always good at sports, but being a girl, I was never allowed to feel as good about it as guys were. My toughness wasn't celebrated. But then I got to the University of North Carolina, and it was O.K. to want to be the best." Anson Dorrance was honored with his name replaced the soccer stadium known as Fetzer Field, as Dorrance Field.

Head coaching record

National team coach
His success at North Carolina led to the United States Soccer Federation hiring Dorrance as the coach of the United States women's national soccer team in 1986. In taking the job Dorrance delivered a letter containing a stark warning to the players he inherited: "If you don't come in fit, I will cut you!" He successfully juggled his duties to both the national team and UNC. In one extreme case, Dorrance left Assistant Coach Bill Palladino to lead UNC to a championship victory in the 1991 NCAA tournament while he led the US Women to a  World Cup championship. In that tournament, the United States won the first Women's World Cup, held in China. When Dorrance ended his tenure in 1994 with the national team, he had accumulated a record of 65–22–5 (.707) record. He has coached some of the finest players in women's soccer history including Michelle Akers, Mia Hamm and Kristine Lilly.

Honors
In May 2005 Dorrance was elected as a member of the North Carolina Sports Hall of Fame. In February 2016 he received the Werner Fricker Builder Award, a special award named after Werner Fricker.

Coaching
North Carolina Tar Heels women
 21x NCAA Division I Tournament Champion (1982, 1983, 1984, 1986–1994, 1996, 1997, 1999, 2000, 2003, 2006, 2008, 2009, 2012)
 22x ACC Tournament Champion (1989–2003, 2005–2009, 2017, 2019)
 23x ACC Regular Season Champion (1987, 1989–1993, 1995–1999, 2001–2008, 2014, 2017, 2019, 2020)

United States women
 Women's World Cup (1991)

Individual
 7x National Coach of the Year (1982, 1986, 1987, 1997, 2000, 2003, 2006)
 12x ACC Coach of the Year (1982, 1986, 1987, 1997, 2000, 2001, 2003, 2004, 2006, 2008, 2018, 2019).
 North Carolina Soccer Hall of Fame (2002)
 North Carolina Sports Hall of Fame (2005)
 National Soccer Hall of Fame (2008)
 United Soccer Coaches' Hall of Fame (2018)

Court cases
In 1998 a former player, Melissa Jennings, sued Dorrance for sexual harassment. He had just cut her from the team. Initially, it appeared the suit was retaliation against Dorrance.  However, Debbie Keller Hill, a former team captain, joined the suit. In October 2004 U.S. District Court Judge N. Carlton Tilley Jr. threw out the six-year lawsuit, stating the "behavior at issue does not constitute severe, pervasive and objectively offensive sexual harassment."  In April 2006 a three judge federal appeals panel voted to not reverse the judgement (2–1).  Jennings appealed to the full court with oral arguments taking place in October 2006. Hill had earlier settled with the university for $70,000.

The 4th U.S. Circuit Court of Appeals, after a rehearing by the full court, vacated summary judgment for defendants in Jennings' lawsuit. The April 9, 2007 decision allowed Jennings to proceed on her Title IX claim and on sexual harassment civil rights claims under 42 U.S.C. § 1983 against Dorrance and a university official. 

The 4th Circuit Court found in favor of Dorrance, the majority opinion stating "When the evidence in this case is viewed most favorably to Jennings, the evidence shows that Dorrance used vulgar language and participated in sexual banter at practice with some women that he coached and that he once directed a vulgar question at Jennings. Jennings immediately responded to Dorrance’s vulgar question with her own profane reply and that ended the inquiry. Dorrance never touched, never threatened, never ogled, and never propositioned Jennings. Because no reasonable jury could find that Dorrance sexually harassed Jennings or find that Jennings’ other claims have merit, we affirm the judgment of the district court." The dissenting opinion, authored by Judge M. Blane Michael, said that Dorrance's conduct "went far beyond simple teasing and qualified as sexual harassment."

On October 1, 2007, the U.S. Supreme Court denied a petition by the state Attorney General's Office for the court to hear a nine-year-old sexual harassment suit against UNC-Chapel Hill and its women's soccer coach, Anson Dorrance.

The refusal by the Supreme Court to hear the case meant that the 4th U.S. Circuit Court of Appeals ruling from 2007 would stand and the case could proceed to trial. On January 14, 2008, the suit was settled out of court and Melissa Jennings received $385,000, mostly used for legal fees. The university also reviewed its sexual harassment policies and procedures, and brought in an outside law professor to help. Dorrance was quoted saying. "I think for everyone concerned, it's a good thing. I really feel like both parties felt it had gone long enough." The coach issued a written apology to the player, her family, and team members saying that his comments were inappropriate.

See also
List of college women's soccer coaches with 250 wins

References

Bibliography

External links

Profile
Oral History Interview with Anson Dorrance from Oral Histories of the American South
National Soccer Hall of Fame profile

1951 births
American soccer coaches
American soccer players
Living people
National Soccer Hall of Fame members
United States women's national soccer team managers
1991 FIFA Women's World Cup managers
FIFA Women's World Cup-winning managers
St. Mary's Rattlers men's soccer players
North Carolina Tar Heels men's soccer players
North Carolina Tar Heels men's soccer coaches
North Carolina Tar Heels women's soccer coaches
American women's soccer coaches
Association football midfielders
American Latter Day Saints
Women's United Soccer Association commentators
St. Mary's University, Texas alumni
Association football player-managers